Lasu Tumi (local Quechua lasu (rasu) snow, ice, mountain with snow, tumi (historical) knife,  "mountain knife", also spelled Lazo Tumi) is a mountain in Peru, about  high. It is located in the Junín Region, Huancayo Province, Pariahuanca District. It lies northeast of a mountain named Ututuyuq (Quechua ututu a small viper, -yuq a suffix, "the one with the ututu", erroneously also spelled Litutoyo).

Ututuyuq (Ututuyoc) is also the name of an intermittent river which originates near the mountain. It is an affluent of the Lampa River.

References

Mountains of Peru
Mountains of Junín Region